This article is a list of notable brand name food products that are presently produced as well as discontinued or defunct, organized by the type of product. This list also includes brand-name beverage mix products.

Baked goods

 Back to Nature (Mondelēz International)
 Bimbo
 Bond Bread
 Bost's Bread
 Burry's
 Cobblestone
 Dave's Killer Bread
 Davidovich Bagels
 Entenmann's
 Holsum Bread
 Home Pride
 Hovis
 King's Hawaiian
 Kits
 Lender's Bagels
 McVitie's
 Merita Breads
 Mother's Pride
 Nabisco
 Nature's Own
 Newman's Own
 Pepperidge Farm
 Polarbröd
 Roman Meal
 Sunbeam Bread
 Tastykake
 Thomas'
 Warburtons
 Westminster Cracker Company
 Wonder Bread

Baking mixes

 Arrowhead Mills 
 Atkins Nutritionals 
 Aunt Jemima 
 Betty Crocker
 Bisquick
 Bob's Red Mill 
 Boulder Brands 
 Cherrybrook Kitchen 
 Dassant 
 Jack & Jason's Pancakes & Waffles 
 Jiffy mix 
 King Arthur Baking 
 Kodiak Cakes 
 Krusteaz 
 Martha White 
 Mrs. Butterworth's 
 Dr. Oetker 
 Pillsbury (brand)
 Ralcorp 
 Streit's

Beverages

 Akta-Vite 
 Almdudler 
 Alpro – soy milk
 Apple Sidra 
 Artos (drink) 
 Asia (soft drink brand) 
 Banana Flavored Milk 
 Banania 
 Barleycup 
 Baron von Lemon 
 Boga (soft drink) 
 Bournvita 
 Bovril 
 Carnation – evaporated milk, instant breakfast
 Caro (drink) 
 Clamato 
 Clipper Teas 
 Club-Mate 
 Cocio 
 Cool Mountain Beverages 
 Cravendale 
 Crystal Light
 Danone 
 Double Seven (soft drink) 
 El Namroud 
 Energen (cereal drink) 
 Frugo 
 Gold Spot 
 Goombay Punch 
 Höpt 
 Horlicks
 Jūrokucha 
 Juven 
 Kalleh Dairy 
 Killer Shake
 Kinnie 
 Kinohimitsu 
 Maltos-Cannabis 
 Manhattan Special 
 Maxwell House International 
 Mercy (drink) 
 Nestlé Milo
 MiO 
 Mirinda 
 Mr Sherick's Shakes 
 Nescafé
 Nespresso
 Nesquik
 Nestea
 Nestlé 
 Nexcite 
 Ovaltine 
 PDQ Chocolate 
 PJ's Smoothies 
 Pog
 POM Wonderful
 Postum 
 Silk
 Sinalco 
 Swiss Miss – hot chocolate
 Vitamalt 
 Vitamin Water
 Wander AG 
 Welch's 
 Wyler's 
 Yop 
 Zarex (drink) 
 Zest-O

Bottled water

Nutritional Drinks
 Ensure
 Horlicks

Soft drinks

 Afri-Cola 
 Coca-Cola
 Pepsi

Biscuits

 Abbey Crunch 
 Aero Biscuits
 Afghan (biscuit)
 Afternoon Tea (biscuits)
 Arnott
 Biscuit rose de Reims
 Biscuits Fossier
 Blue Riband
 BN (biscuit) 
 Breakaway (biscuit)
 Britannia Biscuits
 Burton's
 Cadbury Caramel Crunch
 Cadbury Fingers
 Cadbury Snack
 Cadbury Snaps
 Cameo Creme
 Carr's 
 CBL Munchee Bangladesh
 Ceylon Biscuits Limited
 Cheddars 
 Chips Ahoy!
 Club (biscuit)
 Club Milk
 DeMet's Candy Company
 Domino (cookie)
 Drifter (chocolate bar)
 Famous Amos
 Kinder
 Filipinos (snack food) 
 Fox's Biscuits
 Galletas Fontaneda
 Galletas Gullón
 Gold (biscuit) 
 Happy Faces
 Hello Panda
 Hobnob biscuit 
 HobNob
 Hovis biscuit 
 Hula Hoops 
 Huntley & Palmers
 Iced VoVo
 Jacob's 
 Jaffa Cakes
 Jammie Dodgers
 Kägi Söhne
 Kambly
 Kingston (biscuit)
 Kit Kat
 Kits
 KP Snacks 
 Krispie
 Leibniz-Keks
 Loacker
 Lotus Bakeries
 LU (biscuits)
 Maliban
 McCoy's (crisp) 
 McVitie's 
 Meanie (snack) 
 Monte Carlo (biscuit)
 Neapolitan wafer
 Newman's Own
 Nik Naks (British snack) 
 Oreo
 Parle-G
 Peek Freans 
 Penguin (biscuit) 
 Pirouline
 Plasmon biscuit
 Quadratini
 Quely
 Rebisco
 Skips (snack) 
 Space Raiders (snack food) 
 Sunshine Biscuits (Australia)
 Taxi
 Tim Tam (biscuit)
 Tiny Teddy
 Tracker
 Trio (chocolate bar) 
 Tunnock's wafer
 Tunnock's
 Twiglets 
 Twix
 United Biscuits
 Vienna Fingers
 Wagon Wheels
 Waitrose Duchy Organic
 Walkers Shortbread
 Wheat Crunchies 
 Wright's Biscuits

Crackers and other savoury biscuits

 Club (Keebler)
 Jacobs Cream Crackers
 Ritz
 Ry-Krisp
 Triscuit
 Wheat Thins

Energy bars

 Balance Bar
 CalorieMate
 Clif Bar
 Lärabar
 LUNA Bar
 PowerBar
 Rxbar
 Soldier Fuel
 Tiger's Milk

Breakfast foods

 Cream of Wheat
 Malt-O-Meal
 Maypo – oatmeal
 McCann's Steel Cut Irish Oatmeal
 Quaker Oats Company
 Quaker Instant Oatmeal
 Scott's Porage Oats

Breakfast cereals

Cakes

 Barny Cakes
 Baskin Robbins
 Betty Crocker
 Bumpy cake
 Cadbury Cake Bars
 Cadbury Highlights
 Chocodile Twinkie
 Drake's Cakes
 Dunkin' Donuts
 Hostess CupCake
 Ho Hos
 Hostess (snack cakes)
 Krispy Kreme
 Mars Muffin (McVitie's)
 McVitie's
 Mr Kipling
 Secret Recipe
 Suzy Q
 Twinkie
 Viennetta
 Yodels
 Zingers

Canned (tinned) foods

 Ayam Brand
 Bush's Baked Beans
 Century Tuna
 Chef Boyardee
 Chicken of the Sea
 Contadina – owned by Del Monte Foods
 Crosse & Blackwell
 Del Monte Foods
 Fray Bentos
 Gerber Singles
 Grandma Brown's Baked Beans
 Green Giant
 Greenseas
 Heinz baked beans
 Hunt's
 Libby's
 Manwich
 Prem (food)
 Ro-Tel
 Spam
 StarKist
 Treet
 Van Camp's
 Wolf Brand Chili

Chips, crisps, corn snacks, nuts and seeds

 Adyar Ananda Bhavan
 Andy Capp's fries
 Barcel
 Brannigans
 Bugles (General Mills)
 Cape Cod Potato Chips
 Cheetos
 Cheez Doodles
 Cheez-It
 Cheezies
 CornNuts
 David Sunflower Seeds
 Doritos
 Frito-Lay
 Fritos
 Golden Wonder (Tayto Group)
 Hula Hoops (KP Snacks)
 Kettle Foods
 KP Nuts (KP Snacks)
 Kurkure
 Lay's Stax (Frito-Lay)
 McCoys Crisps
 Monster Munch – corn snack
 Munchos
 Nobby's Nuts
 Phileas Fogg
 Pirate's Booty
 Pringles (Kellogg Company)
 Ringos (Golden Wonder)
 Ruffles
 San Nicasio
 Space Raiders (KP Snacks)
 Sun Chips
 Smith's Crisps
 The Smith's Snackfood Company
 Tudor Crisps
 Twiglets (United Biscuits)
 Twisties
 Tyrrells
 Tyrrells Apple Chips
 Walkers Crisps (Walkers)
 Wheat Crunchies
 Wise Foods
 Wotsits (Walkers)

Condiments

 Ajinomoto
 Hellmann's and Best Foods
 Dennis' Horseradish

Confectionery

Dairy products

 Alaska
 Almarai
 Alpura
 Alquería
 Amul
 Anchor
 Arla
 Borden
 Broughton Foods Company
 Chivers
 Colun
 Conaprole
 Dutch Lady
 Dutch Mill
 Eagle Brand
 Garelick Farms
 Horizon Organic
 Iran Dairy Industries Co.
 La Serenísima
 Lala
 Louis Trauth Dairy
 Magnolia
 Mayfield Dairy
 Meadow Gold Dairies (Hawaii)
 Nestlé
 Organic Valley
 Purity Dairies
 Reddi-wip
 Selecta
 Soprole
 T. G. Lee Dairy
 Tuscan Dairy Farms 
 Vigor

Cheeses and cheese foods

 Alpine Lace
 Borden 
 Cheez Whiz
 Easy Cheese
 Eden
 Gossner Foods
 Kraft
 Palmetto Cheese
 Sargento
 Velveeta

Egg products
 Egg Beaters

Export/wholesale/catering trade
 Moorhouse's

Frozen foods

 Banquet
 Birds Eye
 Findus
 Freezer Queen
 FRoSTA
 Jus-Rol
 Marie Callender's
 Stouffer's
 Tombstone (pizza)
 XLNT Foods

Ice cream and frozen desserts

 Ambrosia
 Angel Delight
 Ben & Jerry's
 Bird's Custard
 Bounty ice cream
 Eskimo
 Gü
 Häagen-Dazs
 Keventers Milkshake
 Magnolia
 Magnum
 Müller Rice
 Selecta
 Solero
 Wall's (see Unilever Heartbrand)
 Walls Cornetto
 Walls Vienetta

Meats

 Argentina
 Armour
 Butterball
 Campofrío
 CDO
 Columbus Craft Meats
 Frank 'n Stuff
 Gorton's of Gloucester
 Gwaltney
 Hebrew National
 Hormel
 Jennie-O – turkey products
 Jimmy Dean
 Libby's
 Maple Leaf
 Omaha Steaks
 Oscar Mayer
 Spam
 Wall's sausages

Oils, butters and fat spreads

 Becel
 Bertolli
 Blue Bonnet
 Country Crock
 Crisco
 Flora
 I Can't Believe It's Not Butter!
 Lambda
 Land O'Lakes
 PAM
 Parkay
 Rafhan
 Sana
 Spry Vegetable Shortening
 Stork
 Wesson cooking oil

Pickles and vinegar

 Branston
 Crosse & Blackwell
 Sarson's
 Datu Puti
 Haywards
 Maille
 Mt. Olive
 Vlasic Pickles

Prepared/ready-made meals and foods

 Buddy Fruits
 Buitoni
 Candwich
 Conimex
 Continental
 DiGiorno
 Findus
 Gardein
 Gardenburger
 Gerber
 Healthy Choice
 Herta Foods – a brand of pre-cooked Frankfurters owned by Nestlé
 Heinz
 Hunt's Snack Pack – pudding
 Kozy Shack – pudding
 La Choy
 Lean Cuisine
 Mrs. Grass
 Swanson
 Swiss Miss – pudding
 Weight Watchers
 Yoplait

Sauces

 Beerenberg Farm (Australia)
 Chicken Tonight
 Hayward's
 Loyd Grossman sauces
 Prego
 Ragú

Seafood
 Ayam Brand

Snack foods

 Peperami – pork sausage snack
 Planters nuts
 Pocky
 Slim Jim
 Space Food Sticks

Popcorn

 Act II
 Jiffy Pop
 Orville Redenbacher's
 Smartfood

Candied popcorn

 Cracker Jack
 Crunch 'n Munch
 Fiddle Faddle
 Poppycock
 Screaming Yellow Zonkers

Soup and noodles

 Batchelor's Super Noodles
 Campbells
 Continental
 Cup-a-Soup
 Cup Noodles
 Hamburger Helper
 Heinz
 Indomie
 Koka (brand)
 Knorr
 Kraft Dinner
 Lucky Me!
 Maggi
 Mie Sedaap
 Mrs. Grass
 Nissin
 Nongshim
 Ottogi
 Pot Noodle and derivatives like Pot Rice
 Progresso
 Samyang
 Sapporo Ichiban
 Sarimi
 Science Noodles
 Super Noodles
 Wyler's

Soy foods
 Alpro – soy yogurt
 Eden Foods Inc.

Spreads, jams and honeys
 Gale's (honey, lemon curd)
 Hartley's (jam)
 Rafhan
 Tiptree (jam, marmalade, sauce, chutney, mustard, honey, lemon curd, Christmas pudding)
 Welch's

Nut butters

 Jif
 Nutella
 Peter Pan
 Skippy
 Squirrel
 Sun-Pat (peanut butter)

Yeast
 Fleischmann's Yeast

Miscellaneous

 Amy's Kitchen
 Bernard Matthews
 Birds
 Carbolite
 China Doll
 Fleischmann's Yeast
 General Mills
 Ginsters
 Harina P.A.N.
 Jel Sert
 Minute Rice
 Mrs. Wagner's Pies
 Quorn
 ReaLemon
 Slim Fast
 Smash
 Square Pie
 Wall's – sausages and pies

See also

 List of brand name breads
 List of brand name condiments
 List of mustard brands
 List of brand name snack foods
 List of ConAgra brands
 List of food companies
 List of frozen food brands
 List of Japanese snacks

References

Food products
 
Brand name